The Larimer School in the Larimer neighborhood of Pittsburgh, Pennsylvania is a school built in 1896. An addition was made in 1904, and the auditorium and gymnasium were added in 1931. The interior includes terrazzo floors and marble wainscotting. The exterior includes an ornately decorated door on the southwestern side of the building (perhaps Romanesque-inspired Renaissance Revival) with statues on pillars, a bas-relief sculpture over the door, and human faces near a marble portion of the roof. It was listed on the National Register of Historic Places in 1986.

The school closed in 1980 and remained vacant for about 40 years. As of 2021, it is being renovated into affordable housing.

Further reading 

 Larimer School at Abandoned

References

Renaissance Revival architecture in Pennsylvania
Art Deco architecture in Pennsylvania
School buildings completed in 1896
Schools in Pittsburgh
School buildings on the National Register of Historic Places in Pennsylvania
National Register of Historic Places in Pittsburgh